The 2002 Oakland Athletics season was the 102nd season in franchise history and the 35th season in Oakland, California. The Athletics finished first in the American League West with a record of 103–59.

The Athletics' 2002 campaign ranks among the most famous in franchise history. Following the 2001 season, Oakland saw the departure of three key players. Billy Beane, the team's general manager, responded with a series of under-the-radar free agent signings. The new-look Athletics, despite a comparative lack of star power, surprised the baseball world by besting the 2001 team's regular season record. The team is most famous, however, for winning 20 consecutive games between August 13 and September 4, 2002. The Athletics' season was the subject of Michael Lewis's 2003 book Moneyball: The Art of Winning an Unfair Game (Lewis was given the opportunity to follow the team around throughout the season). A film adaptation of the book, titled Moneyball, was released in 2011.

Off-season 
 November 2, 2001: Mark Bellhorn was traded by the Oakland Athletics to the Chicago Cubs for Adam Morrissey (minors).
 December 7, 2001: Billy Koch was traded to the Oakland Athletics by the Toronto Blue Jays for Eric Hinske and Justin Miller.
 December 14, 2001: David Justice was traded to the Oakland Athletics by the New York Mets for Mark Guthrie and Tyler Yates. This trade was preceded by a swap between the New York Mets and New York Yankees of Robin Ventura for Justice one week prior.
 January 2, 2002: Scott Hatteberg was signed as a free agent by the Oakland Athletics.
 January 11, 2002: Randy Velarde was signed as a free agent by the Oakland Athletics.
 January 14, 2002: Carlos Peña and Mike Venafro were traded to the Oakland Athletics by the Texas Rangers for Jason Hart, Gerald Laird, Ryan Ludwick, and Mario Ramos.
 March 19, 2002: Justin Duchscherer was traded to the Oakland Athletics by the Texas Rangers for Luis Vizcaíno.

Regular season

Summary 

Oakland's 2002 campaign began on a tumultuous note. During the 2001–02 offseason, the team lost three key free agents to larger market teams: 2000 AL MVP Jason Giambi to the New York Yankees, outfielder Johnny Damon to the Boston Red Sox, and closer Jason Isringhausen to the St. Louis Cardinals. Faced with a number of significant roster holes, general manager Billy Beane sought to replace Damon and Giambi with free agent hitters Scott Hatteberg and David Justice. Beane also made a number of key pitching acquisitions; most notably, he traded for Toronto Blue Jays reliever Billy Koch. Koch ultimately succeeded Isringhausen as the team's closer. Beane also traded for then-unheralded starter Ted Lilly and traded for second baseman Ray Durham. Additionally, the season saw the MLB debuts of second baseman Mark Ellis and eventual starter Aaron Harang.

The new-look Athletics experienced a bumpy start to the season. The team followed a respectable 15–10 start with an abysmal 5–16 run; at the end of their slump, on May 23, the team's record stood at 20–26. From that point forward, the Athletics' fortunes improved significantly. In a prelude to the team's famous late-season winning streak, the Athletics went 16–1 from June 6 to June 24. The surge propelled the club within two games of first place, but a prolonged funk saw the A's play roughly .500 baseball for the next month and a half. That ended with an unremarkable 2–1 loss to the Toronto Blue Jays on August 12.

On August 13, the Athletics began their then-AL-record 20-game win streak. The streak's first win came courtesy of Barry Zito, who allowed three runs (one earned) over eight innings in a 5–4 victory over the Jays. Over the next several weeks, stellar pitching, hitting, and defense all played a significant role in the Athletics' surge. Most notable were the efforts of fourth starter Cory Lidle. During August, Lidle went 5–0 while posting a scant 0.20 earned run average (he allowed one run his final start of the month); three of his five winning decisions were during the streak. Many of the Athletics' victories were by narrow margins; closer Billy Koch recorded either a win or save in 12 of the streak's 20 games.

The Athletics' 18th and 19th wins came courtesy of game-ending hits by shortstop Miguel Tejada. On September 4, Oakland sought to win its 20th consecutive game; in doing so, the team hoped to break the 1947 New York Yankees' American League record of 19 consecutive wins. Their opponent was the Kansas City Royals. Over the first three innings of the game, Oakland shelled Kansas City pitchers Paul Byrd and Darrell May for a total of 11 runs, building a seemingly insurmountable 11–0 lead. Sloppy play down the stretch, however, allowed the Royals to score five runs apiece in the fourth and eighth innings. In the ninth, Billy Koch surrendered a two-out single to Royals pinch hitter Luis Alicea; the single allowed pinch runner Kit Pellow to score the tying run. So the Athletics entered the bottom of the ninth inning with the score tied at 11–11. Pinch hitter Scott Hatteberg then hit a one-out solo home run off of Kansas City reliever Jason Grimsley. The home run clinched the AL-record 20th consecutive victory for the Athletics.

Oakland's streak came to an end with a 6–0 loss to the Minnesota Twins on September 6. The A's continued to play well down the stretch, as evidenced by their final record of 103–59. The club's late-season surge allowed it to hold off the Anaheim Angels, who finished four games behind them at 99–63. Oakland's regular season exploits, however, once again failed to translate into postseason success. The team again lost the American League Division Series (this time to the Twins) in five games.

Tejada and starting pitcher Barry Zito went on to win the American League MVP and Cy Young Award, respectively. Tejada left the Athletics following the 2003 season, while Zito stayed until the end of the 2006 campaign.

Game log 

|- style="text-align:center; style="background-color:#bbffbb;"
| 1 || April 1 || Rangers || 8–3 || Mulder (1–0) || Park (0–1) || — || 43,908 || 1–0 || W1
|- style="text-align:center; style="background-color:#bbffbb;"
| 2 || April 2 || Rangers || 3–2 || Koch (1–0) || Miceli (0–1) || — || 10,267 || 2–0 || W2
|- style="text-align:center; style="background-color:#bbffbb;"
| 3 || April 3 || Rangers || 9–6 || Mecir (1–0) || Rodriguez (0–1) || Koch (1) || 23,259 || 3–0 || W3
|- style="text-align:center; style="background-color:#ffbbbb;"
| 4 || April 4 || Rangers || 5–7 || Davis (1–0) || Lidle (0–1) || — || 15,081 || 3–1 || L1
|- style="text-align:center; style="background-color:#ffbbbb;"
| 5 || April 5 || @ Mariners || 1–7 || Baldwin (1–0) || Hiljus (0–1) || — || 40,303 || 3–2 || L2
|- style="text-align:center; style="background-color:#bbffbb;"
| 6 || April 6 || @ Mariners || 8–3 || Mulder (2–0) || García (0–2) || — || 45,093 || 4–2 || W1
|- style="text-align:center; style="background-color:#bbffbb;"
| 7 || April 7 || @ Mariners || 6–5 || Hudson (1–0) || Moyer (0–1) || Koch (2) || 39,870 || 5–2 || W2
|- style="text-align:center; style="background-color:#bbffbb;"
| 8 || April 9 || @ Rangers || 5–4 (11) || Koch (2–0) || Seánez (0–1) || — || 20,158 || 6–2 || W3
|- style="text-align:center; style="background-color:#ffbbbb;"
| 9 || April 10 || @ Rangers || 2–4 || Burba (1–0) || Lidle (0–2) || Rocker (1) || 21,384 || 6–3 || L1
|- style="text-align:center; style="background-color:#ffbbbb;"
| 10 || April 11 || @ Rangers || 0–7 || Davis (2–0) || Mulder (2–1) || — || 21,903 || 6–4 || L2
|- style="text-align:center; style="background-color:#bbffbb;"
| 11 || April 12 || @ Angels || 5–1 || Hudson (2–0) || Ortiz (1–1) || — || 31,815 || 7–4 || W1
|- style="text-align:center; style="background-color:#bbffbb;"
| 12 || April 13 || @ Angels || 7–2 || Hiljus (1–1) || Washburn (0–2) || — || 33,554 || 8–4 || W2
|- style="text-align:center; style="background-color:#ffbbbb;"
| 13 || April 14 || @ Angels || 1–4 || Appier (1–1) || Zito (0–1) || Levine (3) || 32,881 || 8–5 || L1
|- style="text-align:center; style="background-color:#ffbbbb;"
| 14 || April 16 || Mariners || 2–6 (7) || Piñeiro (1–0) || Lidle (0–3) || — || 13,022 || 8–6 || L2
|- style="text-align:center; style="background-color:#ffbbbb;"
| 15 || April 17 || Mariners || 4–7 || Moyer (2–1) || Hudson (2–1) || Sasaki (4) || 31,260 || 8–7 || L3
|- style="text-align:center; style="background-color:#bbffbb;"
| 16 || April 18 || Angels || 4–2 || Hiljus (2–1) || Ortiz (1–2) || Koch (3) || 9,145 || 9–7 || W1
|- style="text-align:center; style="background-color:#ffbbbb;"
| 17 || April 19 || Angels || 7–9 || Washburn (1–2) || Fyhrie (0–1) || Percival (2) || 12,468 || 9–8 || L1
|- style="text-align:center; style="background-color:#bbffbb;"
| 18 || April 20 || Angels || 8–7 || Bradford (1–0) || Levine (1–1) || Koch (4) || 20,253 || 10–8 || W1
|- style="text-align:center; style="background-color:#bbffbb;"
| 19 || April 21 || Angels || 6–5 || Venafro (1–0) || Percival (0–1) || — || 20,088 || 11–8 || W2
|- style="text-align:center; style="background-color:#ffbbbb;"
| 20 || April 23 || Yankees || 1–2 || Hernández (3–1) || Hudson (2–2) || Rivera (6) || 40,360 || 11–9 || L1
|- style="text-align:center; style="background-color:#ffbbbb;"
| 21 || April 24 || Yankees || 5–8 || Stanton (1–0) || Magnante (0–1) || Rivera (7) || 54,513 || 11–10 || L2
|- style="text-align:center; style="background-color:#bbffbb;"
| 22 || April 25 || Yankees || 6–2 || Zito (1–1) || Mussina (3–1) || — || 31,870 || 12–10 || W1
|- style="text-align:center; style="background-color:#bbffbb;"
| 23 || April 26 || White Sox || 6–4 || Lidle (1–3) || Parque (0–1) || Koch (5) || 10,129 || 13–10 || W2
|- style="text-align:center; style="background-color:#bbffbb;"
| 24 || April 27 || White Sox || 16–1 || Fyhrie (1–1) || Buehrle (4–2) || — || 26,111 || 14–10 || W3
|- style="text-align:center; style="background-color:#bbffbb;"
| 25 || April 28 || White Sox || 10–0 || Hudson (3–2) || Ritchie (2–2) || — || 20,365 || 15–10 || W4
|- style="text-align:center; style="background-color:#ffbbbb;"
| 26 || April 30 || @ Yankees || 2–8 || Wells (4–0) || Zito (1–2) || — || 32,888 || 15–11 || L1
|-

|- style="text-align:center; style="background-color:#bbffbb;"
| 27 || May 1 || @ Yankees || 4–1 || Hiljus (3–1) || Mussina (3–2) || Koch (6) || 31,006 || 16–11 || W1
|- style="text-align:center; style="background-color:#ffbbbb;"
| 28 || May 2 || @ Yankees || 2–9 || Clemens (4–2) || Lidle (1–4) || — || 30,463 || 16–12 || L1
|- style="text-align:center; style="background-color:#ffbbbb;"
| 29 || May 3 || @ White Sox || 1–6 || Buehrle (5–2) || Fyhrie (1–2) || — || 15,746 || 16–13 || L2
|- style="text-align:center; style="background-color:#ffbbbb;"
| 30 || May 4 || @ White Sox || 2–10 || Ritchie (3–2) || Hudson (3–3) || — || 27,511 || 16–14 || L3
|- style="text-align:center; style="background-color:#bbffbb;"
| 31 || May 5 || @ White Sox || 3–2 || Zito (2–2) || Wright (3–3) || Koch (7) || 27,275 || 17–14 || W1
|- style="text-align:center; style="background-color:#ffbbbb;"
| 32 || May 7 || Red Sox || 7–9 || Arrojo (2–0) || Mecir (1–1) || Urbina (12) || 19,715 || 17–15 || L1
|- style="text-align:center; style="background-color:#ffbbbb;"
| 33 || May 8 || Red Sox || 6–12 || Burkett (3–0) || Hiljus (3–2) || — || 40,155 || 17–16 || L2
|- style="text-align:center; style="background-color:#ffbbbb;"
| 34 || May 9 || Red Sox || 1–5 || Lowe (5–1) || Hudson (3–4) || — || 18,477 || 17–17 || L3
|- style="text-align:center; style="background-color:#ffbbbb;"
| 35 || May 10 || Blue Jays || 2–6 || Prokopec (2–4) || Mulder (2–2) || — || 10,824 || 17–18 || L4
|- style="text-align:center; style="background-color:#bbffbb;"
| 36 || May 11 || Blue Jays || 7–4 || Zito (3–2) || Miller (2–1) || — || 21,115 || 18–18 || W1
|- style="text-align:center; style="background-color:#ffbbbb;"
| 37 || May 12 || Blue Jays || 4–11 || Halladay (3–1) || Lidle (1–5) || Walker (1) || 19,519 || 18–19 || L1
|- style="text-align:center; style="background-color:#ffbbbb;"
| 38 || May 14 || @ Red Sox || 2–6 || Burkett (4–0) || Hudson (3–5) || — || 31,404 || 18–20 || L2
|- style="text-align:center; style="background-color:#ffbbbb;"
| 39 || May 15 || @ Red Sox || 2–8 || Lowe (6–1) || Hiljus (3–3) || — || 32,346 || 18–21 || L3
|- style="text-align:center; style="background-color:#bbffbb;"
| 40 || May 16 || @ Red Sox || 5–0 || Zito (4–2) || Castillo (2–4) || — || 33,057 || 19–21 || W1
|- style="text-align:center; style="background-color:#ffbbbb;"
| 41 || May 17 || @ Blue Jays || 1–7 || Halladay (4–1) || Mulder (2–3) || — || 14,061 || 19–22 || L1
|- style="text-align:center; style="background-color:#ffbbbb;"
| 42 || May 18 || @ Blue Jays || 3–6 || Miller (3–1) || Fyhrie (1–3) || Escobar (7) || 17,846 || 19–23 || L2
|- style="text-align:center; style="background-color:#ffbbbb;"
| 43 || May 19 || @ Blue Jays || 0–11 || Loaiza (2–0) || Hudson (3–6) || — || 23,408 || 19–24 || L3
|- style="text-align:center; style="background-color:#ffbbbb;"
| 44 || May 21 || Orioles || 4–6 (14) || Driskill (1–0) || Venafro (1–1) || Julio (9) || 10,245 || 19–25 || L4
|- style="text-align:center; style="background-color:#bbffbb;"
| 45 || May 22 || Orioles || 7–6 || Fyhrie (2–3) || Maduro (2–4) || Koch (8) || 20,444 || 20–25 || W1
|- style="text-align:center; style="background-color:#ffbbbb;"
| 46 || May 23 || Orioles || 3–11 || Ponson (3–3) || Mulder (2–4) || — || 11,737 || 20–26 || L1
|- style="text-align:center; style="background-color:#bbffbb;"
| 47 || May 24 || Devil Rays || 9–8 || Mecir (2–1) || Zambrano (1–4) || Koch (9) || 25,458 || 21–26 || W1
|- style="text-align:center; style="background-color:#bbffbb;"
| 48 || May 25 || Devil Rays || 6–0 || Harang (1–0) || Harper (1–2) || Bradford (1) || 31,697 || 22–26 || W2
|- style="text-align:center; style="background-color:#bbffbb;"
| 49 || May 26 || Devil Rays || 7–0 || Zito (5–2) || Kennedy (1–2) || — || 15,943 || 23–26 || W3
|- style="text-align:center; style="background-color:#bbffbb;"
| 50 || May 28 || @ Orioles || 5–2 || Mulder (3–4) || Maduro (2–5) || Koch (10) || 24,825 || 24–26 || W4
|- style="text-align:center; style="background-color:#ffbbbb;"
| 51 || May 29 || @ Orioles || 5–10 || Bauer (2–2) || Fyhrie (2–4) || — || 24,913 || 24–27 || L1
|- style="text-align:center; style="background-color:#ffbbbb;"
| 52 || May 30 || @ Devil Rays || 3–4 (13) || Harper (2–2) || Bradford (1–1) || — || 10,130 || 24–28 || L2
|- style="text-align:center; style="background-color:#bbffbb;"
| 53 || May 31 || @ Devil Rays || 13–9 || Venafro (2–1) || Yan (2–2) || — || 10,227 || 25–28 || W1
|-

|- style="text-align:center; style="background-color:#bbffbb;"
| 54 || June 1 || @ Devil Rays || 8–3 || Zito (6–2) || Kennedy (3–5) || — || 14,073 || 26–28 || W2
|- style="text-align:center; style="background-color:#bbffbb;"
| 55 || June 2 || @ Devil Rays || 4–2 || Mulder (4–4) || Rupe (5–6) || Koch (11) || 10,563 || 27–28 || W3
|- style="text-align:center; style="background-color:#ffbbbb;"
| 56 || June 3 || Mariners || 1–4 || García (7–4) || Harang (1–1) || Sasaki (13) || 14,188 || 27–29 || L1
|- style="text-align:center; style="background-color:#bbffbb;"
| 57 || June 4 || Mariners || 3–2 (10) || Koch (3–0) || Hasegawa (3–1) || — || 13,528 || 28–29 || W1
|- style="text-align:center; style="background-color:#ffbbbb;"
| 58 || June 5 || Mariners || 0–5 || Moyer (5–2) || Lidle (1–6) || — || 35,647 || 28–30 || L1
|- style="text-align:center; style="background-color:#bbffbb;"
| 59 || June 6 || Mariners || 10–4 || Zito (7–2) || Baldwin (4–5) || — || 27,344 || 29–30 || W1
|- style="text-align:center; style="background-color:#bbffbb;"
| 60 || June 7 || Astros || 5–3 || Mulder (5–4) || Oswalt (6–4) || Koch (12) || 17,453 || 30–30 || W2
|- style="text-align:center; style="background-color:#bbffbb;"
| 61 || June 8 || Astros || 5–1 || Harang (2–1) || Reynolds (3–6) || — || 27,115 || 31–30 || W3
|- style="text-align:center; style="background-color:#bbffbb;"
| 62 || June 9 || Astros || 7–6 || Koch (4–0) || Dotel (3–3) || — || 35,065 || 32–30 || W4
|- style="text-align:center; style="background-color:#bbffbb;"
| 63 || June 10 || Brewers || 8–6 || Bradford (2–1) || de los Santos (1–2) || Koch (13) || 10,584 || 33–30 || W5
|- style="text-align:center; style="background-color:#bbffbb;"
| 64 || June 11 || Brewers || 11–2 || Zito (8–2) || Figueroa (1–4) || — || 11,223 || 34–30 || W6
|- style="text-align:center; style="background-color:#bbffbb;"
| 65 || June 12 || Brewers || 8–0 || Mulder (6–4) || Sheets (3–7) || — || 20,847 || 35–30 || W7
|- style="text-align:center; style="background-color:#bbffbb;"
| 66 || June 14 || @ Giants || 3–2 || Hudson (4–6) || Schmidt (2–2) || Koch (14) || 41,457 || 36–30 || W8
|- style="text-align:center; style="background-color:#ffbbbb;"
| 67 || June 15 || @ Giants || 2–6 || Zerbe (2–0) || Harang (2–2) || — || 41,298 || 36–31 || L1
|- style="text-align:center; style="background-color:#bbffbb;"
| 68 || June 16 || @ Giants || 2–1 || Zito (9–2) || Rueter (7–5) || Koch (15) || 41,550 || 37–31 || W1
|- style="text-align:center; style="background-color:#bbffbb;"
| 69 || June 18 || @ Pirates || 4–2 || Mulder (7–4) || Fogg (7–5) || Koch (16) || 21,943 || 38–31 || W2
|- style="text-align:center; style="background-color:#bbffbb;"
| 70 || June 19 || @ Pirates || 3–2 (10) || Bradford (3–1) || Williams (1–2) || Koch (17) || 30,562 || 39–31 || W3
|- style="text-align:center; style="background-color:#bbffbb;"
| 71 || June 20 || @ Pirates || 5–3 || Hudson (5–6) || Benson (0–4) || Koch (18) || 22,464 || 40–31 || W4
|- style="text-align:center; style="background-color:#bbffbb;"
| 72 || June 21 || @ Reds || 5–3 || Harang (3–2) || Williamson (2–1) || Koch (19) || 26,101 || 41–31 || W5
|- style="text-align:center; style="background-color:#bbffbb;"
| 73 || June 22 || @ Reds || 10–3 || Zito (10–2) || Chen (2–4) || — || 27,243 || 42–31 || W6
|- style="text-align:center; style="background-color:#bbffbb;"
| 74 || June 23 || @ Reds || 5–1 || Mulder (8–4) || Reitsma (3–5) || — || 23,961 || 43–31 || W7
|- style="text-align:center; style="background-color:#bbffbb;"
| 75 || June 24 || @ Mariners || 13–2 || Lidle (2–6) || García (10–5) || — || 45,602 || 44–31 || W8
|- style="text-align:center; style="background-color:#ffbbbb;"
| 76 || June 25 || @ Mariners || 1–7 || Baldwin (6–6) || Hudson (5–7) || — || 43,985 || 44–32 || L1
|- style="text-align:center; style="background-color:#ffbbbb;"
| 77 || June 26 || @ Mariners || 0–1 || Hasegawa (4–1) || Bradford (3–2) || Sasaki (18) || 42,120 || 44–33 || L2
|- style="text-align:center; style="background-color:#ffbbbb;"
| 78 || June 27 || @ Mariners || 4–7 || Halama (3–2) || Zito (10–3) || Rhodes (1) || 42,159 || 44–34 || L3
|- style="text-align:center; style="background-color:#bbffbb;"
| 79 || June 28 || Giants || 10–6 || Mulder (9–4) || Hernández (6–9) || — || 46,345 || 45–34 || W1
|- style="text-align:center; style="background-color:#ffbbbb;"
| 80 || June 29 || Giants || 3–5 || Schmidt (4–2) || Lidle (2–7) || Nen (21) || 53,501 || 45–35 || L1
|- style="text-align:center; style="background-color:#bbffbb;"
| 81 || June 30 || Giants || 7–0 || Hudson (6–7) || Ortiz (6–5) || — || 54,123 || 46–35 || W1
|-

|- style="text-align:center; style="background-color:#ffbbbb;"
| 82 || July 1 || Twins || 4–5 || Romero (4–1) || Venafro (2–2) || Guardado (25) || 13,503 || 46–36 || L1
|- style="text-align:center; style="background-color:#bbffbb;"
| 83 || July 2 || Twins || 4–3 || Bradford (4–2) || Guardado (1–2) || — || 15,317 || 47–36 || W1
|- style="text-align:center; style="background-color:#ffbbbb;"
| 84 || July 3 || Twins || 1–2 || Santana (4–1) || Mulder (9–5) || Guardado (26) || 30,213 || 47–37 || L1
|- style="text-align:center; style="background-color:#bbffbb;"
| 85 || July 4 || Royals || 3–2 || Koch (5–0) || Hernández (1–1) || — || 28,315 || 48–37 || W1
|- style="text-align:center; style="background-color:#bbffbb;"
| 86 || July 5 || Royals || 4–3 || Mecir (3–1) || Hernández (1–2) || — || 53,802 || 49–37 || W2
|- style="text-align:center; style="background-color:#ffbbbb;"
| 87 || July 6 || Royals || 3–4 (10) || Mullen (1–2) || Koch (5–1) || Voyles (1) || 18,259 || 49–38 || L1
|- style="text-align:center; style="background-color:#bbffbb;"
| 88 || July 7 || Royals || 3–2 || Zito (11–3) || Byrd (11–6) || Koch (20) || 31,676 || 50–38 || W1
|- style="text-align:center; background:#bbb;"
|colspan=10| All–Star Break (July 8–10)
|- style="text-align:center; style="background-color:#bbffbb;"
| 89 || July 11 || @ Orioles || 4–1 || Mulder (10–5) || Erickson (3–9) || Koch (21) || 32,507 || 51–38 || W2
|- style="text-align:center; style="background-color:#bbffbb;"
| 90 || July 12 || @ Orioles || 1–0 || Hudson (7–7) || Johnson (3–6) || Koch (22) || 33,366 || 52–38 || W3
|- style="text-align:center; style="background-color:#bbffbb;"
| 91 || July 13 || @ Orioles || 6–0 || Zito (12–3) || Driskill (6–2) || — || 36,100 || 53–38 || W4
|- style="text-align:center; style="background-color:#ffbbbb;"
| 92 || July 14 || @ Orioles || 3–6 || López (9–3) || Lidle (2–8) || Julio (18) || 32,853 || 53–39 || L1
|- style="text-align:center; style="background-color:#bbffbb;"
| 93 || July 15 || @ Devil Rays || 4–0 || Lilly (4–6) || Rupe (5–10) || — || 10,116 || 54–39 || W1
|- style="text-align:center; style="background-color:#bbffbb;"
| 94 || July 16 || @ Devil Rays || 2–1 || Mulder (11–5) || Sosa (0–2) || Koch (23) || 10,592 || 55–39 || W2
|- style="text-align:center; style="background-color:#ffbbbb;"
| 95 || July 17 || Angels || 4–10 || Appier (8–7) || Hudson (7–8) || — || 38,547 || 55–40 || L1
|- style="text-align:center; style="background-color:#bbffbb;"
| 96 || July 18 || Angels || 2–0 || Zito (13–3) || Sele (7–7) || Koch (24) || 15,733 || 56–40 || W1
|- style="text-align:center; style="background-color:#bbffbb;"
| 97 || July 19 || Rangers || 10–0 || Lidle (3–8) || Myette (0–1) || — || 21,445 || 57–40 || W2
|- style="text-align:center; style="background-color:#bbffbb;"
| 98 || July 20 || Rangers || 6–5 || Koch (6–1) || Burba (4–5) || — || 31,129 || 58–40 || W3
|- style="text-align:center; style="background-color:#ffbbbb;"
| 99 || July 21 || Rangers || 3–7 (12) || Powell (2–1) || Mecir (3–2) || — || 27,567 || 58–41 || L1
|- style="text-align:center; style="background-color:#bbffbb;"
| 100 || July 23 || @ Angels || 2–1 || Zito (14–3) || Appier (8–8) || Koch (25) || 25,370 || 59–41 || W1
|- style="text-align:center; style="background-color:#ffbbbb;"
| 101 || July 24 || @ Angels || 1–5 || Sele (8–7) || Hudson (7–9) || — || 25,240 || 59–42 || L1
|- style="text-align:center; style="background-color:#ffbbbb;"
| 102 || July 25 || @ Angels || 4–5 || Shields (3–1) || Mecir (3–3) || Weber (5) || 31,653 || 59–43 || L2
|- style="text-align:center; style="background-color:#ffbbbb;"
| 103 || July 26 || @ Rangers || 4–12 || Rodriguez (1–1) || Mulder (11–6) || — || 34,585 || 59–44 || L3
|- style="text-align:center; style="background-color:#ffbbbb;"
| 104 || July 27 || @ Rangers || 6–10 (10) || Kolb (1–0) || Koch (6–2) || — || 35,359 || 59–45 || L4
|- style="text-align:center; style="background-color:#bbffbb;"
| 105 || July 28 || @ Rangers || 12–2 || Zito (15–3) || Alvarez (0–3) || — || 24,022 || 60–45 || W1
|- style="text-align:center; style="background-color:#ffbbbb;"
| 106 || July 29 || Indians || 6–8 || Mulholland (1–0) || Magnante (0–2) || Wohlers (1) || 18,297 || 60–46 || L1
|- style="text-align:center; style="background-color:#ffbbbb;"
| 107 || July 30 || Indians || 4–5 || Drese (9–8) || Lidle (3–9) || Wohlers (2) || 14,737 || 60–47 || L2
|- style="text-align:center; style="background-color:#bbffbb;"
| 108 || July 31 || Indians || 6–4 || Mulder (12–6) || Westbrook (0–1) || Koch (26) || 47,574 || 61–47 || W1
|-

|- style="text-align:center; style="background-color:#bbffbb;"
| 109 || August 1 || Tigers || 5–3 || Bowie (1–0) || Sparks (5–11) || Koch (27) || 13,861 || 62–47 || W2
|- style="text-align:center; style="background-color:#ffbbbb;"
| 110 || August 2 || Tigers || 1–3 || Redman (7–9) || Zito (15–4) || Acevedo (19) || 17,197 || 62–48 || L1
|- style="text-align:center; style="background-color:#bbffbb;"
| 111 || August 3 || Tigers || 8–4 || Hudson (8–9) || Lima (2–5) || — || 29,648 || 63–48 || W1
|- style="text-align:center; style="background-color:#bbffbb;"
| 112 || August 4 || Tigers || 4–0 || Lidle (4–9) || Maroth (3–4) || — || 24,546 || 64–48 || W2
|- style="text-align:center; style="background-color:#bbffbb;"
| 113 || August 6 || @ Red Sox || 9–1 || Mulder (13–6) || Wakefield (5–4) || — || 34,059 || 65–48 || W3
|- style="text-align:center; style="background-color:#bbffbb;"
| 114 || August 7 || @ Red Sox || 3–2 || Harang (4–2) || Burkett (10–5) || Koch (28) || 33,325 || 66–48 || W4
|- style="text-align:center; style="background-color:#ffbbbb;"
| 115 || August 8 || @ Red Sox || 2–4 || Lowe (16–5) || Zito (15–5) || Urbina (26) || 33,855 || 66–49 || L1
|- style="text-align:center; style="background-color:#bbffbb;"
| 116 || August 9 || @ Yankees || 3–2 (16) || Bowie (2–0) || Hitchcock (1–1) || — || 54,316 || 67–49 || W1
|- style="text-align:center; style="background-color:#bbffbb;"
| 117 || August 10 || @ Yankees || 8–0 || Lidle (5–9) || Wells (12–6) || — || 54,439 || 68–49 || W2
|- style="text-align:center; style="background-color:#ffbbbb;"
| 118 || August 11 || @ Yankees || 5–8 || Mussina (14–6) || Mulder (13–7) || — || 54,703 || 68–50 || L1
|- style="text-align:center; style="background-color:#ffbbbb;"
| 119 || August 12 || Blue Jays || 1–2 || Loaiza (5–6) || Harang (4–3) || Escobar (24) || 14,178 || 68–51 || L2
|- style="text-align:center; style="background-color:#bbffbb;"
| 120 || August 13 || Blue Jays || 5–4 || Zito (16–5) || Carpenter (4–5) || Koch (29) || 17,466 || 69–51 || W1
|- style="text-align:center; style="background-color:#bbffbb;"
| 121 || August 14 || Blue Jays || 4–2 || Hudson (9–9) || Walker (5–3) || Koch (30) || 40,528 || 70–51 || W2
|- style="text-align:center; style="background-color:#bbffbb;"
| 122 || August 16 || White Sox || 1–0 || Lidle (6–9) || Buehrle (15–9) || Koch (31) || 22,622 || 71–51 || W3
|- style="text-align:center; style="background-color:#bbffbb;"
| 123 || August 17 || White Sox || 9–2 || Mulder (14–7) || Garland (8–9) || — || 40,658 || 72–51 || W4
|- style="text-align:center; style="background-color:#bbffbb;"
| 124 || August 18 || White Sox || 7–4 || Zito (17–5) || Wright (8–11) || — || 31,489 || 73–51 || W5
|- style="text-align:center; style="background-color:#bbffbb;"
| 125 || August 19 || @ Indians || 8–1 || Hudson (10–9) || Báez (9–10) || — || 27,696 || 74–51 || W6
|- style="text-align:center; style="background-color:#bbffbb;"
| 126 || August 20 || @ Indians || 6–3 || Harang (5–3) || Westbrook (1–2) || Koch (32) || 27,527 || 75–51 || W7
|- style="text-align:center; style="background-color:#bbffbb;"
| 127 || August 21 || @ Indians || 6–0 || Lidle (7–9) || Rodríguez (0–1) || — || 26,916 || 76–51 || W8
|- style="text-align:center; style="background-color:#bbffbb;"
| 128 || August 22 || @ Indians || 9–3 || Mulder (15–7) || Phillips (1–2) || Bradford (2) || 27,759 || 77–51 || W9
|- style="text-align:center; style="background-color:#bbffbb;"
| 129 || August 23 || @ Tigers || 9–1 || Zito (18–5) || Powell (1–3) || — || 21,807 || 78–51 || W10
|- style="text-align:center; style="background-color:#bbffbb;"
| 130 || August 24 || @ Tigers || 12–3 || Hudson (11–9) || Lima (4–6) || — || 19,045 || 79–51 || W11
|- style="text-align:center; style="background-color:#bbffbb;"
| 131 || August 25 || @ Tigers || 10–7 || Mecir (4–3) || Walker (1–1) || Koch (33) || 24,346 || 80–51 || W12
|- style="text-align:center; style="background-color:#bbffbb;"
| 132 || August 26 || @ Royals || 6–3 || Lidle (8–9) || May (3–9) || Koch (34) || 11,096 || 81–51 || W13
|- style="text-align:center; style="background-color:#bbffbb;"
| 133 || August 27 || @ Royals || 6–4 || Mulder (16–7) || Hernández (3–3) || Koch (35) || 13,077 || 82–51 || W14
|- style="text-align:center; style="background-color:#bbffbb;"
| 134 || August 28 || @ Royals || 7–1 || Zito (19–5) || Sedlacek (3–4) || — || 15,952 || 83–51 || W15
|- style="text-align:center; style="background-color:#bbffbb;"
| 135 || August 30 || Twins || 4–2 || Hudson (12–9) || Radke (6–4) || Koch (36) || 25,221 || 84–51 || W16
|- style="text-align:center; style="background-color:#bbffbb;"
| 136 || August 31 || Twins || 6–3 || Mecir (5–3) || Romero (8–2) || Koch (37) || 42,841 || 85–51 || W17
|-

|- style="text-align:center; style="background-color:#bbffbb;"
| 137 || September 1 || Twins || 7–5 || Koch (7–2) || Guardado (1–3) || — || 37,676 || 86–51 || W18
|- style="text-align:center; style="background-color:#bbffbb;"
| 138 || September 2 || Royals || 7–6 || Koch (8–2) || Grimsley (3–5) || — || 26,325 || 87–51 || W19
|- style="text-align:center; style="background-color:#bbffbb;"
| 139 || September 4 || Royals || 12–11 || Koch (9–2) || Grimsley (3–6) || — || 55,528 || 88–51 || W20
|- style="text-align:center; style="background-color:#ffbbbb;"
| 140 || September 6 || @ Twins || 0–6 || Radke (7–4) || Lidle (8–10) || — || 27,409 || 88–52 || L1
|- style="text-align:center; style="background-color:#bbffbb;"
| 141 || September 7 || @ Twins || 2–0 || Mulder (17–7) || Mays (3–6) || Koch (38) || 43,628 || 89–52 || W1
|- style="text-align:center; style="background-color:#bbffbb;"
| 142 || September 8 || @ Twins || 6–0 || Zito (20–5) || Milton (13–8) || — || 20,102 || 90–52 || W2
|- style="text-align:center; style="background-color:#bbffbb;"
| 143 || September 9 || @ Angels || 2–1 || Hudson (13–9) || Appier (14–10) || Koch (39) || 28,145 || 91–52 || W3
|- style="text-align:center; style="background-color:#ffbbbb;"
| 144 || September 10 || @ Angels || 2–5 || Ortiz (13–9) || Lilly (4–7) || Percival (36) || 35,323 || 91–53 || L1
|- style="text-align:center; style="background-color:#ffbbbb;"
| 145 || September 11 || @ Angels || 5–6 || Shields (4–3) || Tam (0–1) || Percival (37) || 34,302 || 91–54 || L2
|- style="text-align:center; style="background-color:#ffbbbb;"
| 146 || September 12 || @ Angels || 6–7 || Donnelly (1–1) || Koch (9–3) || — || 31,304 || 91–55 || L3
|- style="text-align:center; style="background-color:#bbffbb;"
| 147 || September 13 || Mariners || 5–0 || Zito (21–5) || Valdez (8–11) || — || 38,210 || 92–55 || W1
|- style="text-align:center; style="background-color:#bbffbb;"
| 148 || September 14 || Mariners || 1–0 || Hudson (14–9) || Moyer (13–8) || — || 40,309 || 93–55 || W2
|- style="text-align:center; style="background-color:#ffbbbb;"
| 149 || September 15 || Mariners || 3–6 || Piñeiro (14–6) || Harang (5–4) || Sasaki (35) || 38,783 || 93–56 || L1
|- style="text-align:center; style="background-color:#bbffbb;"
| 150 || September 16 || Angels || 4–3 || Koch (10–3) || Levine (4–4) || — || 22,326 || 94–56 || W1
|- style="text-align:center; style="background-color:#ffbbbb;"
| 151 || September 17 || Angels || 0–1 (10) || Weber (7–2) || Koch (10–4) || Percival (40) || 25,894 || 94–57 || L1
|- style="text-align:center; style="background-color:#bbffbb;"
| 152 || September 18 || Angels || 7–4 || Zito (22–5) || Callaway (1–1) || Koch (40) || 50,730 || 95–57 || W1
|- style="text-align:center; style="background-color:#bbffbb;"
| 153 || September 19 || Angels || 5–3 || Hudson (15–9) || Appier (14–11) || Koch (41) || 27,435 || 96–57 || W2
|- style="text-align:center; style="background-color:#bbffbb;"
| 154 || September 20 || Rangers || 4–2 || Mecir (6–3) || Kolb (3–5) || Rincón (1) || 25,281 || 97–57 || W3
|- style="text-align:center; style="background-color:#bbffbb;"
| 155 || September 21 || Rangers || 6–3 || Tam (1–1) || Nitkowski (0–1) || Koch (42) || 24,862 || 98–57 || W4
|- style="text-align:center; style="background-color:#bbffbb;"
| 156 || September 22 || Rangers || 7–5 || Mulder (18–7) || Park (9–7) || Koch (43) || 35,697 || 99–57 || W5
|- style="text-align:center; style="background-color:#ffbbbb;"
| 157 || September 24 || @ Mariners || 7–8 || Hasegawa (8–2) || Tam (1–2) || Rhodes (2) || 39,037 || 99–58 || L1
|- style="text-align:center; style="background-color:#ffbbbb;"
| 158 || September 25 || @ Mariners || 2–3 || Rhodes (10–4) || Mecir (6–4) || Sasaki (37) || 39,776 || 99–59 || L2
|- style="text-align:center; style="background-color:#bbffbb;"
| 159 || September 26 || @ Mariners || 5–3 (10) || Koch (11–4) || Hasegawa (8–3) || — || 45,822 || 100–59 || W1
|- style="text-align:center; style="background-color:#bbffbb;"
| 160 || September 27 || @ Rangers || 3–2 || Mulder (19–7) || Park (9–8) || Koch (44) || 31,521 || 101–59 || W2
|- style="text-align:center; style="background-color:#bbffbb;"
| 161 || September 28 || @ Rangers || 10–8 || Lilly (5–7) || Kolb (3–6) || Mecir (1) || 44,442 || 102–59 || W3
|- style="text-align:center; style="background-color:#bbffbb;"
| 162 || September 29 || @ Rangers || 8–7 || Zito (23–5) || Benoit (4–5) || — || 34,529 || 103–59 || W4
|-

|- style="text-align:center;"
| Legend:       = Win       = Loss       = PostponementBold = Athletics team memberSource: baseball-reference.com

Season standings

Record vs. opponents

Draft picks (first round) 

The following were drafted in the first round of the 2002 MLB draft by the Athletics on June 4, 2002:
 Nick Swisher (16th pick, compensatory)
 Joe Blanton (24th pick, compensatory)
 John McCurdy (26th pick)
 Benjamin Fritz (30th pick, compensatory) 
 Jeremy Brown (35th pick, compensatory) 
 Mark Teahen (39th pick, compensatory)

Trades 
 May 22, 2002: John Mabry was traded by the Philadelphia Phillies to the Oakland Athletics for Jeremy Giambi.
 June 21, 2002: Bob Ryan was traded to the Boston Red Sox for cash considerations.
 July 5, 2002: Jeff Weaver was traded by the Detroit Tigers to the New York Yankees, and cash was sent by the Tigers to the Oakland Athletics, as part of a 3-team trade. The Athletics sent Carlos Peña, Franklyn Germán, and a player to be named later to the Tigers. The Yankees sent Ted Lilly, John-Ford Griffin, and Jason Arnold (minors) to the Athletics. The Athletics completed the trade by sending Jeremy Bonderman to the Tigers on August 22, 2002.
 July 25, 2002: Ray Durham was traded by the Chicago White Sox to the Oakland Athletics with cash for Jon Adkins.
 July 30, 2002: Ricardo Rincón was traded by the Cleveland Indians to the Oakland Athletics for Marshall McDougall.

Roster

Postseason 
The Athletics clinched the American League West with a regular season record of 103–59, advancing to the first round of the postseason. They were defeated in the 2002 American League Division Series three games to two by the American League Central champion Minnesota Twins. The Twins would later be defeated in the 2002 American League Championship Series by the eventual World Series champion Anaheim Angels.

Postseason game log 

|- style="text-align:center; style="background-color:#ffbbbb;"
| 1 || October 1 || Twins || 5–7 || Radke (1–0) || Lilly (0–1) || Guardado (1) || 34,853 || MIN 1–0
|- style="text-align:center; style="background-color:#bbffbb;"
| 2 || October 2 || Twins || 9–1 || Mulder (1–0) || Mays (0–1) || — || 31,953 || Tied 1–1
|- style="text-align:center; style="background-color:#bbffbb;"
| 3 || October 4 || @ Twins || 6–3 || Zito (1–0) || Reed (0–1) || Koch (1) || 55,932 || OAK 2–1
|- style="text-align:center; style="background-color:#ffbbbb;"
| 4 || October 5 || @ Twins || 2–11 || Milton (1–0) || Hudson (0–1) || — || 55,960 || Tied 2–2
|- style="text-align:center; style="background-color:#ffbbbb;"
| 5 || October 6 || Twins || 4–5 || Radke (2–0) || Mulder (1–1) || — || 32,146 || MIN 3–2
|-

|- style="text-align:center;"
| Legend:       = Win       = Loss       = PostponementBold = Athletics team member Source: baseball-reference.com

Player statistics

Pitching 
Note: POS = Position; G = Games pitched; IP = Innings pitched; W = Wins; L = Losses; SV = Saves; ERA = Earned run average; SO = Strikeouts

Batting 
Note: POS = Position; G = Games played; AB = At bats; AVG = Batting average; OBP = On base percentage; H = Hits; 2B = Doubles; 3B = Triples; HR = Home runs; RBI = Runs batted in

Note: Only players with at least one at-bat are listed.

Farm system

References 

General references:

 2002 Oakland Athletics at Baseball Reference
 2002 Oakland Athletics at Baseball Almanac
 

Oakland Athletics Season
Oakland Athletics Season
Oakland Athletics
American League West champion seasons
 Oakland Athletics seasons